The South African National Basketball Club Championship is the national championship for premier basketball teams in South Africa. The winner of the national championship qualifies for the qualifying tournaments of the Basketball Africa League (BAL). 

The competition is organised by Basketball South Africa, the national basketball federation, since 2021.

The current defending champions are the Cape Town Tigers, who won the 2021 and 2022 titles.

Format and rules
Each team is allowed to register a maximum of 20 players, of which 4 can be foreign players.

Champions

OT denotes a game that finished after overtime.

References

Basketball competitions in South Africa